Danny Kirmond (born ) is an English professional rugby league footballer who plays as a  forward for York City Knights in the Betfred Championship. He has formerly played for England at international level.

He has played at club level for Featherstone Rovers in the RFL Championship. Kirmond has also played for the Huddersfield Giants in the Super League, and on loan from Huddersfield at the 
Wakefield Trinity Wildcats in 2010.

Background
Kirmond was born in Sharlston, West Yorkshire, England.

He played for the Stanley Rangers.

Playing career

Featherstone Rovers
Unfortunately, Kirmonds début season saw the club relegated to the third tier of British rugby league. In 2007 Kirmond was the Featherstone Rovers' leading try scorer as they were promoted back to the Championship. Kirmond left the Featherstone Rovers at the end of 2007 after playing 73 times and scoring 41 tries in the three years he was at the club.

Huddersfield Giants
In 2009 he was part of the Huddersfield Giants team that got to the Challenge Cup Final but lost 25-16 to the Warrington Wolves. In 2010, Kirmond was loaned out to Super League rivals Wakefield Trinity where he made 17 appearances and scored twice. Kirmond returned to the Huddersfield Giants in 2011 but this would be his last season after playing 55 times for the Huddersfield Giants scoring 10 times.

Wakefield Trinity
In 2012, Kirmond signed for Wakefield Trinity after his successful loan spell two years earlier in 2010. Kirmond was named captain mid season in 2012. In 2015, Kirmond captain Trinity in the Million Pound Game against the Bradford Bulls, whom they beat to ensure their Super League status would be saved.

York City Knights
On 3 September 2020 it was announced that Kirmond would join York City Knights for the 2021 season

International career
After an impressive start to the 2012 season at Wakefield Trinity, Kirmond was named in England's pre-season International Origin Series against the Exiles. This was his only England cap to date.

References

External links
Wakefield Trinity profile
SL profile

1985 births
Living people
England national rugby league team players
English rugby league players
Featherstone Rovers players
Huddersfield Giants players
Rugby league second-rows
Rugby league wingers
Rugby league players from Wakefield
Wakefield Trinity players
York City Knights players